Faraoani is a commune in Bacău County, Western Moldavia, Romania. It is composed of two villages, Faraoani and Valea Mare (Nagypatak). 

On the eastern side of the commune is the Faraoani railway station, serving the Căile Ferate Române Line 500 that runs from Bucharest to Focșani, Bacău, and on north to the Ukraininan border.

At the 2002 census, 99.1% of inhabitants were ethnic Romanians and 0.8% Csangos. 99.4% were Roman Catholic and 0.6% Romanian Orthodox.

Natives
Anton Coșa
Ioan Duma

References

Communes in Bacău County
Localities in Western Moldavia